The Battle of Kojima (児島合戦), also called Battle of Fujito (藤戸の戦い), was a battle of the Genpei War of the Heian period of Japanese history, and took place in 1184.

Battle 
In pursuit of the fleeing Taira from Ichi-no-Tani, on their way to Yashima, Minamoto no Noriyori engaged and defeated his enemies in battle at Kojima. The attack was led by Sasaki Moritsuna, who swam his horse across a narrow strait between Kojima and the mainland of Honshū.

See also 

 The Tale of Heike

References

1180s in Japan
1184 in Asia
Kojima 1184
Kojima